The list of ship launches in 1879 includes a chronological list of some ships launched in 1879.


References

Sources

1879
Ship launches